The West Coast Eagles are an Australian rules football team based in Perth, Western Australia. The 2021 AFL Women's season was their second season in that competition, their first season with Daniel Pratt as coach, and their second season with Emma Swanson as captain. They won two out of the nine games they played, their only wins being by one point against  and 39 points against . They finished 12th out of 14 on the ladder, missing out on qualifying for finals.

The season was marked by many injuries to the team's players, most notably to star player Dana Hooker, who was unable to play for most of the season due to a kitchen accident. Young midfielders Mikayla Bowen and Isabella Lewis were standout players, both receiving Rising Star nominations. Lewis was the team's best and fairest player, winning the West Coast Club Champion medal. Bowen was the team's sole inclusion in the All-Australian squad. Grace Kelly was the team's leading goalkicker, with seven goals.

Background

The West Coast Eagles are an Australian rules football team based in Perth, Western Australia. They began playing in the AFL Women's in the 2020 season. That year, they won one out of their six games, finishing last on the ladder for their conference.

In October 2020, it was announced that Daniel Pratt would take over as senior coach from Luke Dwyer, who resigned. Pratt had been a development coach and an assistant coach for West Coast's men's team for seven years. He was assisted by forwardline coaches Michelle Cowan and Jo Beechey, midfield coaches Brady Grey and Ryan Turnbull, and backline coach Andrew Di Loreto. Emma Swanson was captain for a second season. Dana Hooker was vice-captain for a second season as well. Courtney Guard and Alicia Janz continued being part of the leadership group, along with newcomer Parris Laurie. Mikayla Bowen and Hayley Bullas were appointed as "emerging leaders", a new position which is used for developing leadership skills.

The club had 3,081 AFLW members in 2021, the second most of any club, behind .

Playing list

Changes
During the off season, Talia Radan and Emily Bonser retired, and Kate Bartlett, Cassie Davidson, Emily McGuire, Danika Pisconeri and Tarnee Tester were delisted. Andrea Gilmore was also delisted following a season as an injury replacement player.

This draft pick had the requirement that it had to be traded with another club for an established player. The pick was allowed to be traded in combination with other draft picks or players, but it could not be used in a trade that involved West Coast receiving any draft picks. During the 2020 trade period in August, West Coast had two trades.

Before the 2020 AFLW, McKenzie Dowrick was placed on the inactive list to allow her more time to recover from surgery. During the 2020 draft on 6 October, teams were only allowed to pick from a pool of players in their state. West Coast drafted Isabella Lewis (pick 3), Shanae Davison (pick 18), Julie-Anne Norrish (pick 32) and Andrea Gilmore (pick 53), who was previously delisted. They passed on picks 56 and 59.

If players were undrafted in their nominated state, clubs from outside that state with room on their lists could sign those players. This mechanism enabled West Coast to sign Amber Ward and Lauren Gauci, both of whom are from South Australia, on 8 October. In November, Demi Liddle was signed as an injury replacement player for Ashton Hill, who ruptured an anterior cruciate ligament in round 1 of the previous season. In January, Katelyn Pope was signed as an injury replacement player for Mhicca Carter, who had a season-ending foot injury.

Statistics

Season summary
For the 2021 AFLW season, the conference system was removed, with every team now on the same ladder. The planned fixture was revealed on 11 December 2020; continued restrictions and border closures caused by the COVID-19 pandemic, however, forced it to change several times. The first change was rounds one and two, in which West Coast were originally going to face  at Metricon Stadium, and then  in Perth. That changed on 22 January to West Coast facing  in Perth, and then  (GWS) at Norwood Oval in Adelaide, in a GWS home match. This was because there were no restrictions to travel between Western Australia and South Australia, and GWS had temporarily relocated to Adelaide.

Rounds 1–4
West Coast's round one match took place against the Adelaide Crows, the reigning premiers, on 30 January 2021. At half time, the Eagles were only behind by five points, as the Crows missed opportunities to score. However, Adelaide dominated the third quarter, kicking four unanswered goals and even preventing any inside 50s for West Coast. The final score was 18–56. This match had eight new players for West Coast, and three players suffered injuries: Brianna Green received an ankle injury, Maddy Collier was concussed and Demi Liddle injured her back.

Western Australia went into lockdown on 1 February, resulting in South Australia closing its border to Western Australia. West Coast's match against GWS was cancelled as a result, and West Coast were not allowed to train together during the lockdown. After the lockdown was lifted on 5 February, a Western Derby against  was scheduled instead for 7 February, albeit with no crowds. The derby meant that the Western Australian teams did not have to leave Western Australia or have another team enter. During the week between rounds one and two, vice-captain Dana Hooker cut a tendon in her foot when a knife fell off her kitchen bench, ruling her out for the rest of the season. She joined Green, Collier and Liddle as the four outs for round 2.

West Coast lost their match against Fremantle 14–23, playing at Fremantle Oval in heavy rain. Aisling McCarthy got the first and only goal in the first quarter, but Fremantle took over from there, reaching 20 points at three quarter time. Imahra Cameron kicked a goal in the final quarter to reduce the margin to 6 points, but Fremantle held off from there, winning by nine points. The result wasn't considered a total failure for West Coast, considering that their previous match against Fremantle was a 45-point blowout, and that Fremantle finished at the top of the ladder in 2020, however, there were several more injuries during the match. Niamh Kelly and Andrea Gilmore suffered finger injuries and Parris Laurie sustained a right knee injury. Katelyn Pope made her AFLW debut in this match. Daniel Pratt said after the match that West Coast may have to use players from outside their squad to field a team in round three if none of the injured players are able to play.

The fixture for round three was announced on 8 February. West Coast were scheduled to face  at the Swinburne Centre on 14 February. A COVID-19 outbreak in Melbourne caused Western Australia to close its border to Victoria, resulting in the cancellation of West Coast's match against Richmond on 11 February. The following day, it was announced that West Coast would play  at Hickey Park on Monday, 15 February.

During the week between rounds two and three, Claremont WAFLW players Jessica Low and Sasha Goranova trained with West Coast in case the team needed them as top-up players. West Coast ended up not needing them, with several players back from injury for round three. Maddy Collier returned after completing concussion protocols, Parris Laurie and Andrea Gilmore's injuries were minor enough to allow them to return, and Melissa Caulfield was back for the first time this season following a pre-season hamstring injury. During the first half of their match against the Brisbane Lions, the Eagles dominated the inside 50s and clearances, but because they were unable to convert that into goals, the margin at half time was one point in favour of the Lions. Brisbane dominated for the rest of the match though, including kicking four goals in the first six minutes of the third quarter. The final score was 20–65 in favour of the Lions. Andrea Gilmore suffered another injury, this time a concussion in the third quarter, ruling her out of round four due to the concussion protocol.

The round four fixture was revealed on 14 February, with West Coast facing GWS on Sunday, 21 February at Blacktown International Sportspark Oval. In that match, Alicia Janz made her West Coast debut, and Lauren Gauci made her AFLW debut. West Coast were beaten yet again in round four, with the final score being 28–48. The Eagles lead for a brief moment in the first quarter, but GWS lead for the rest of the match. The only injury was to Aisling McCarthy, who had a knee injury after landing awkwardly in the third quarter.

Rounds 5–9

On 21 February, the round five fixture was revealed. West Coast were scheduled to play against fellow winless side , in the Eagles' first home game since round one. The round five match was Niamh Kelly's and Demi Liddle's first match back from injury. Aisling McCarthy was also due to play her first game back, but was a late out due to her knee injury, being replaced by Kate Orme. Sophie McDonald and Courtney Guard were omitted. West Coast got their first win of the season in that round, beating Gold Coast 34–33. Mikayla Bowen stood out, getting 21 disposals, seven marks, three clearances and the match-winning goal. She received a Rising Star nomination for her effort. Yet another injury occurred, with Tayla Bresland receiving a hamstring injury in the first quarter.

Between rounds five and six, over a third of West Coast's players were on its injury list. The round six fixture was revealed on 27 February. West Coast were scheduled to play Fremantle for the second time in a season. Aisling McCarthy made a return from injury in this game. The Eagles were thrashed by Fremantle, which was played at Optus Stadium in front of West Coast's largest crowd for the season. The final score was 8–75, with Grace Kelly scoring the Eagles' only goal.

The fixture for the remaining rounds was revealed on 4 March. On 9 March, the round seven match against Geelong was changed to Monday, 15 March. In the match, West Coast had their second win of the season, and largest win in their history, beating Geelong 53–14. Imahra Cameron kicked three goals, a record for the club. Brianna Green was back from injury. Emma Swanson was reported to the match review panel for rough conduct due to an off-the-ball bump on Geelong's Georgie Rankin which gave Rankin a concussion. Swanson received a two match ban for the incident, causing her to miss the remainder of the season.

In round eight, West Coast were beaten by Richmond 34–42, although they almost made a comeback in the fourth quarter. At half time, the margin was 22 points with Richmond in front. The Eagles had kicked no goals in the first half compared to Richmond's three. But West Coast started to catch up during the second half, kicking three third-quarter goals, compared to Richmond with just one. The Eagles managed to get the margin to seven points during the fourth quarter, but Richmond managed to hold off West Coast. Mikayla Bowen and Isabella Lewis were the strongest among the midfield, with 21 and 18 disposals respectively. Lewis received a Rising Star nomination for this effort. West Coast suffered a multitude of injuries in that match, with Aisling McCarthy (corked thigh), Belinda Smith (cork), Shanae Davison (hamstring) and Maddy Collier (concussion) all injured.

Collier, McCarthy and Davison were all left out for the final match of the season due to their injuries, joining a large list of key players who could not play. Parris Laurie also suffered an ankle injury just before the start of the match, too late for her to be replaced in the team. West Coast were thrashed by St Kilda, the score being 20–76. West Coast ended the season 12th on the ladder, capping off an injury-plagued season having not qualified for finals.

Results

Ladder

Awards
Mikayla Bowen received a Rising Star nomination in round five, and Isabella Lewis received a nomination in round eight. Mikayla Bowen was also named in the initial 40-woman All-Australian squad, but was not named in the final 21-woman team. West Coast was only one of two teams that did not have any player in the All-Australian team in 2021, the other team being the Gold Coast Suns.

First-year player Isabella Lewis won the Club Champion award for best and fairest player, with 40 votes. Behind her was Aisling McCarthy, on 37 votes, Mikayla Bowen, on 35 votes, and Maddy Collier, Grace Kelly and Niamh Kelly, on 34 votes. Lewis was also the Best First Year Player, and Parris Laurie was Best Clubperson.

See also
 2021 West Coast Eagles season

References

West Coast Eagles seasons
2021 AFL Women's season